Pedro Hendrick Vaal Neto (born 1944) is an Angolan former diplomat. A member of the National Liberation Front of Angola until the 1990s. Until September 12, 2011, Neto was the Angolan ambassador to Egypt.

He studied in Caconda, Ambriz, Huambo, Benguela and Luanda. 
He participated in various political seminars in Switzerland, Zambia and the United States.
In 1959 he dedicated his life to the liberation of Angola and lived in the woods.
In thirteen years, he traveled in more than eighty countries around the world.
In 1963 he was persecuted by the PIDE and joined the National Liberation Front of Angola in the north of Angola and went with them to the Democratic Republic of Congo, where he attends successfully Institut National D'Etudes Politiques.
 Until July 21, 1981 he lived in Lisbon.
 On June 1, 1999 he was Minister of Social Communication
With a presidential decree from September 12, 2011 his ambassadorship to Egypt, Jordan, Syria, Iran, Iraq, Yemen, Oman and Lebanon ended and he was appointed representative to Zimbabwe.

References

External links
 Obituary of Holden Roberto

1944 births
Living people
20th-century Angolan people
21st-century Angolan people
Ambassadors of Angola to Egypt
National Liberation Front of Angola politicians
Social Communication ministers of Angola